Sporting Réunis Saint-Dié was a French association football team. Based in Saint-Dié-des-Vosges, Lorraine, France, they are currently playing in the Championnat de France Amateurs 2 Group B, the fifth tier in the French football league system.

Defunct football clubs in France
Sport in Vosges (department)
1946 establishments in France
2019 disestablishments in France
Association football clubs established in 1946
Association football clubs disestablished in 2019